Sullivan (formerly Winfield) is a village in Jefferson County, Wisconsin, United States. The population was 651 at the 2020 census. The village is located within the Town of Sullivan, and is known to residents of southern Wisconsin including the Madison and Milwaukee metro areas as the location of the National Weather Service forecast office MKX, although its mailing address is in nearby Dousman.

History
A post office called Sullivan has been in operation since 1846. The village took its name from the Town of Sullivan.

Geography
The center of the village is situated at the intersection of Main Street (Hwy 18 and Hwy F) and Palmyra Street (Hwy E).

Demographics

2010 census

As of the census of 2010, there were 669 people, 304 households, and 177 families living in the village. The racial makeup of the village was 98.1% White, 0.3% African American, 0.1% Native American, 0.3% Asian, and 1.2% from two or more races. Hispanic or Latino of any race were 1.6% of the population.

There were 304 households, of which 29.9% had children under the age of 18 living with them, 43.4% were married couples living together, 7.9% had a female householder with no husband present, 6.9% had a male householder with no wife present, and 41.8% were non-families. 36.2% of all households were made up of individuals, and 12.8% had someone living alone who was 65 years of age or older. The average household size was 2.20 and the average family size was 2.86.

The median age in the village was 38.6 years. 22.7% of residents were under the age of 18; 6% were between the ages of 18 and 24; 29.3% were from 25 to 44; 30.2% were from 45 to 64; and 11.8% were 65 years of age or older. The gender makeup of the village was 48.6% male and 51.4% female.

2000 census
As of the census of 2000, there were 688 people, 298 households, and 185 families living in the village. The population density was 614.2 people per square mile (237.2/km2). There were 321 housing units at an average density of 286.6 per square mile (110.7/km2). The racial makeup of the village was 98.98% White, 0.15% Black or African American, 0.29% Native American, 0.29% Asian, 0.15% from other races, and 0.15% from two or more races. 0.15% of the population were Hispanic or Latino of any race.

There were 298 households, out of which 30.2% had children under the age of 18 living with them, 49.3% were married couples living together, 6.7% had a female householder with no husband present, and 37.9% were non-families. 30.5% of all households were made up of individuals, and 9.7% had someone living alone who was 65 years of age or older. The average household size was 2.31 and the average family size was 2.92.

In the village, the population was spread out, with 22.2% under the age of 18, 9.9% from 18 to 24, 39.2% from 25 to 44, 18.3% from 45 to 64, and 10.3% who were 65 years of age or older. The median age was 34 years. For every 100 females, there were 104.8 males. For every 100 females age 18 and over, there were 109.0 males.

The median income for a household in the village was $43,229, and the median income for a family was $50,833. Males had a median income of $36,875 versus $27,404 for females. The per capita income for the village was $24,621. About 1.0% of families and 1.8% of the population were below the poverty line, including 2.2% of those under age 18 and 2.4% of those age 65 or over.

Education
Sullivan Elementary School was the only school in the village but is no longer open. However, a new Sullivan Elementary School was built nearby and is part of Jefferson School District. It is located only a few blocks from Main Street.

References

External links

Sullivan Area Chamber of Commerce

Villages in Jefferson County, Wisconsin
Villages in Wisconsin